Ceropales elegans is a spider wasp species in the genus Ceropales. It is found in Texas.

References

 bugguide.net

Insects described in 1872
Ceropalinae